Ski Butternut, also known as Butternut Basin, is a ski resort in Great Barrington, Massachusetts, located on Warner Mountain in The Berkshires.

Channing and Jane Murdock took control of the area in 1963, naming the area Butternut Basin after the large groves of butternut trees located in the basin of the mountain. Family friends of the Murdocks', the Kennedys visited Butternut. 

The mountain currently features 22 trails, ten ski lifts, two terrain parks, a tubing area, and a PSIA-affiliated ski school. Ski Butternut now features 3 quad lifts. In the off-season, the mountain hosts a number of summer concerts and festivals, including the annual Berkshires Arts Festival. The hours are Monday - Friday 9 AM - 4 PM, and 8:15 AM - 4 PM Saturdays, Sundays, and Holidays.

Ski Butternut also offers tubing in the winter.

References

External links
 Ski Butternut - Official site
 G-Bar-S Ranch - New England Lost Ski Areas Project
  Butternut - NewEnglandSkiHistory.com - Ski area and CCC trails history

Buildings and structures in Berkshire County, Massachusetts
Great Barrington, Massachusetts
Ski areas and resorts in Massachusetts
Sports in Berkshire County, Massachusetts
Tourist attractions in Berkshire County, Massachusetts